Deshbandhu means "friend of the nation" in Hindi and Bengali, and may refer to:

Deshbandhu, popular name of Chittaranjan Das, lawyer noted for his role in the Indian independence movement
Deshbandhu (newspaper)
Deshbandhu College, University of Delhi 
Deshbandhu College for Girls in Kolkata
Deshbandhu Mahavidyalaya, college in Chittaranjan, Burdwan district, West Bengal
People
Deshbandhu Gupta (1901–1951), Indian freedom fighter
Desh Bandhu Gupta (1938–2017), Indian entrepreneur 
Desh Bandu, common nickname for Adrian Cola Rienzi (b. Krishna Deonarine Tiwari), Indo-Trinidadian lawyer, politician and trade unionist

Other 

 Deshbandhu Group, Bangladeshi conglomerate